Wu Ming-yi (born 20 June 1971) is a multidisciplinary Taiwanese artist, author, Professor of Sinophone literature at National Dong Hwa University and environmental activist. His ecological parable The Man with the Compound Eyes (2011) was published in English in 2013.

Biography
Wu was born in 1971 in Taoyuan, Taiwan (now Taoyuan District, Taoyuan). He holds a BA in marketing from Fu Jen Catholic University and a PhD in Chinese Literature from National Central University. He published his first novel in 1997.

In 2000, he began teaching Chinese literature and creative writing at National Dong Hwa University.

In 2006, Wu resigned from teaching to take uninterrupted time to write and travel, which is when he started his Book The Man with the Compound Eyes.
Dong Hwa University later agreed to a one year sabbatical.

Work
Wu is known for writing environmental literature. He is the author of several literary works, including collections of essays, short stories and novels. He is considered one of the major Taiwanese writers of his generation with writings translated into English, French, Turkish, Japanese, Korean, Czech and Indonesian. In Chinese, he is especially well known for his non-fiction books on butterflies, The Book of Lost Butterflies (2000) and The Dao of Butterflies (2003), which he also designed and illustrated. 

In The Man with the Compound Eyes, an ecological parable or eco-fantasy, he tells the story of a young Pacific islander, Atelie (Atile'i in the English translation), from the fictitious island of Wayo Wayo (suggesting Bora Bora) who arrives on the East Coast of Taiwan when the 'trash vortex', a floating mountain of trash which has formed out of the Great Pacific Trash Vortex, collides with the island. The book has been described as "a masterpiece of environmental literature about an apocalyptic aboriginal encounter with modernity...Trash, resource shortages, and the destruction of Taiwan's coastline as a result of the pursuit of unenlightened self-interest are unremarkable raw materials, but [Wu Mingyi] mashes them into art." His literature agent described it as a "Taiwanese Life of Pi". 

His 2015 book The Stolen Bicycle has been described as a study of bicycles in Taiwan during World War II. An English translation was published in 2017, and in March 2018 the book was nominated for the Man Booker International Prize. It became the center of a diplomatic dispute when, after pressure from the People's Republic of China, the awards organizer changed his nationality from Taiwan to "Taiwan, China". In April 2018, the Man Booker International Prize made the final call stating that "Wu Ming-Yi is listed as ‘Taiwan’".

Works

Novels
We're Closed Today 《本日公休》（Chiuko 九歌出版社，1997）
Grandfather Tiger 《虎爺》（Chiuko 九歌出版社，2003）
Routes in the Dream 《睡眠的航線》（2-fishes 二魚文化，2007）
The Man with the Compound Eyes 《複眼人》（Summer Festival 夏日出版社，2011) 304 Pages, published in English August 29, 2013 by Harvill Secker Randomhouse Paperback and e book, 3 March 2015 and by Vintage Pantheon in North America in spring 2014. 
The Magician on the Skywalk 《天橋上的魔術師》 （Summer Festival 夏日出版社，2011）
The Stolen Bicycle 《單車失竊記》(Cite Publishing Ltd. 麥田城邦文化，2015) 416 Pages, published in English August 28, 2017 by Text Publishing
The Land of Little Rain 《苦雨之地》(Thinkingdom Media Group Ltd. 新經典文化，2019)

Essay Collections
The Book of Lost Butterflies 《迷蝶誌》（Wheat Field Press 麥田出版社，2000）；（Reprinted by Summer Festival 夏日出版社，2010）
The Dao of Butterflies 《蝶道》（2-fishes 二魚文化，2003）；修訂版（二魚文化，2010）
So Much Water So Close to Home 《家離水邊那麼近》（2-fishes 二魚文化，2007）
Above Flame 《浮光》（ThinKingDom 新經典文化，2014）

Literary Theory
Liberating Nature through Writing 《以書寫解放自然：台灣現代自然書寫的探索》（Da'an Press 大安出版社，2011）；Reprinted under the name 'The Search for Modern Taiwanese Nature Writing 1980-2002：Liberating Nature through Writing' 《臺灣現代自然書寫的探索 1980-2002：以書寫解放自然 BOOK 1》（Summer Festival 夏日出版社，2011）
(Co-edited With Wu Sheng) Wetlands - Petrochemicals - Island Imagination 《溼地．石化．島嶼想像》（Unique Route 有鹿文化，2011）
Essays by Taiwanese Nature Writers 1980-2002: Liberating Nature through Writing, vol. 2 《臺灣自然書寫的作家論 1980-2002：以書寫解放自然 BOOK 2》（Summer Festival 夏日出版社，2011）
The Heart of Nature—From Nature Writing to Ecological Criticism: Liberating Nature through Writing, vol. 3 《自然之心─從自然書寫到生態批評：以書寫解放自然 BOOK 3》（Summer Festival 夏日出版社，2011）

Edited
Selected Taiwanese Nature Writing 《臺灣自然寫作選》（2-fishes 二魚文化，2003）

Awards and honors

International
2007: Routes in the Dream 《睡眠的航線》 named on Asia Weekly's Chinese Language Best 10 Books
2014: Prix du livre insulaire (fr) for The Man with the Compound Eyes 《複眼人》
2015: The Man with the Compound Eyes 《複眼人》 named on Time Out Beijing'''s The best Chinese fiction books of the last century
2016: The Twitter Literature Award (ja) ranked second in Overseas category for The Magician on the Skywalk 《天橋上的魔術師》
2016: Japan Booksellers' Award ranked third in Excellent translations category for The Magician on the Skywalk 《天橋上的魔術師》
2016: The Best Translation Award (ja) final candidate for The Magician on the Skywalk 《天橋上的魔術師》
2016: Dream of the Red Chamber Award final candidate for The Stolen Bicycle《單車失竊記》
2018: Man Booker International Prize nomination for The Stolen Bicycle 《單車失竊記》

Domestic

1989: National Students Literature Award for Father's Wooden Ruler 〈父親的木尺〉
1992: UNITAS Debut New Author Short Story Award for The Last Xiyilieke〈最後的希以列克〉
1996: Taiwan Literature Magazine Wang Shixun New Author Award for Traces of the Enemy 〈敵蹤〉
1998: Liang Shiqiu Literary Award for Lost Butterflies 〈迷蝶〉
1998: Ecology and Reporting Literature Award for Flying〈飛〉
1999: Central Daily Literature Award for Eyes〈眼〉
2000: Taipei Literature Award Creativity Award for The Book of Lost Butterflies《迷蝶誌》
2001: UDN Literature Award Best Novel for Grandfather Tiger 〈虎爺〉
2003: China Times Open Book Award for The Way of Butterflies2007: China Times Openbook Award for So Much Water So Close to Home《家離水邊那麼近》
2010: Tao of Butterflies 《蝶道》 named on Kingstone Bookstore's Most Influential Books of the Year
2011: China Times Open Book Award for The Man with the Compound Eyes 《複眼人》
2012: China Times Open Book Award for The Magician on the Skywalk 《天橋上的魔術師》
2012: The Magician on the Skywalk 《天橋上的魔術師》 named on Books.com.tw's Best Book of the Year
2014: Chiuko Prose Award for Miracle (negative film) 《美麗世（負片）》
2015: Above Flame《浮光》 named on Kingstone Bookstore's Most Influential Books of the Year
2015: China Times Openbook Award for Above Flame 《浮光》
2015: Golden Tripod Award for Above Flame 《浮光》
2016: Taiwan Literature Award (zh) for The Stolen Bicycle 《單車失竊記》
2016: UDN Literature Prize (zh) for The Stolen Bicycle, The Magician on the Skywalk, and So Much Water So Close to HomeReferences

External links
 , official website
Wu Ming-Yi  The Grayhawk Agency, Literature agency Taiwan, undated, accessed 2 September 2018 
 Dan Bloom Shooting for the stars, Taipei Times, April 29, 2013. Article about English translation of The Man with the Compound Eyes''.

21st-century Taiwanese writers
Living people
1971 births
People from Taoyuan District
Fu Jen Catholic University alumni
National Central University alumni
Academic staff of the National Dong Hwa University
Taiwanese male novelists
Taiwanese environmentalists
Writers from Taoyuan City